Diederik van Aalst, Dirk van Aalst, Thierry of Alost or also known as het kind van Aalst (English: The child of Aalst), was the last lord/count of the Land of Aalst.

Diederik was a son of Iwein van Aalst and Laureta van de Elzas. He married Lauretta van Hainaut, daughter of Count Boudewijn IV and Alice of Namur. He died childless in the year 1166. Because Diederik had no heir, his belongings and the land of Aalst went to Philip of Alsace.

References 

Counts of Flanders
People from Aalst, Belgium
1166 deaths
Year of birth unknown